Aglaia elliptica is a species of plant in the family Meliaceae. It is found in Brunei, Indonesia, Malaysia, Myanmar, the Philippines, and Thailand.

References

elliptica
Least concern plants
Taxonomy articles created by Polbot